Vincent Locke is an American comic book artist known for his work on Deadworld and A History of Violence and for his ultraviolent album covers for death metal band Cannibal Corpse.

Biography
Locke began work in 1986 illustrating Deadworld, a zombie horror comic that soon became an underground hit.

Since then, his illustrative talents in comics have included The Sandman, American Freak, Batman, Witchcraft: Le Terreur, The Spectre, and A History of Violence, which was later made into a movie directed by David Cronenberg and starring Viggo Mortensen. He has done work for 2000 AD, including one Judge Dredd story.

Locke has also created ultra-violent watercolor paintings to be used as album covers for the death metal band Cannibal Corpse. Also, he has provided illustrations for the "weird erotica" of dark-fantasy author Caitlín R. Kiernan, providing black and white artwork strongly reminiscent of Aubrey Beardsley's style for her collections Frog Toes and Tentacles and Tales from the Woeful Platypus, as well as for Kiernan's monthly Sirenia Digest. Recent projects have included illustrating the first issue of Polluto: The Anti-Pop Culture Journal. He is also known for providing art work for RPGs by White Wolf Publishing and Wizards of the Coast. A press release dated May 6, 2012 announced Locke's graphic novel collaboration with writer Jasmine Lyraka for the Wagnerian opera metal project Lyraka.

He lives with his wife and three children in Michigan, where he continues to draw and paint.

Bibliography
Comics work includes:

American Freak: A Tale of the Un-Men (with Dave Louapre, 5-issue limited series, Vertigo, 1994)
A History of Violence (with John Wagner, Paradox Press, 1997)
The Books of Faerie: Auberon's Tale (inks and finished art, Vertigo, 1998)
Tales From the Black Museum:
 "Feeders and Eaters" (with John Smith, in Judge Dredd Megazine #250, October 2006)
 "The Incredible Teatime Torture Show" (with Tony Lee, in Judge Dredd Megazine #284, May 2009)
Judge Dredd:
 "The Sexmek Slasher" (with John Wagner, in 2000 AD #1521, January 2007)
 "Birthday Boy" (with Pat Mills, in 2000 AD #1613-1616, November–December 2008)
 Tharg's Future Shocks: "Yggdrassil" (with Arthur Wyatt, in 2000 AD #1561, 2007)

Role-playing games
White Wolf Publishing: numerous credits

Wizards of the Coast (as interior artist):
Pool of Radiance: Attack on Myth Drannor (Forgotten Realms) (2000)			
Living Greyhawk Gazetteer (2000)
Wheel of Time Roleplaying Game (2001)
Faiths and Pantheons (Forgotten Realms) (2002)
City of the Spider Queen (Forgotten Realms) (2002)
Underdark (Forgotten Realms) (2003)
Unapproachable East (Forgotten Realms) (2003)
Races of Faerûn (Forgotten Realms) (2003)
Shining South (Forgotten Realms) (2004)
Lost Empires of Faerûn (Forgotten Realms) (2005)

Music
With Cannibal Corpse
 Eaten Back to Life (1990) (Cover art and logo)
 Butchered at Birth (1991) (Cover art and logo)
 Tomb of the Mutilated (1992) (Cover art)
 Hammer Smashed Face (EP) (1993) (Cover art)
 The Bleeding (1994) (Cover art)
 Vile (1996) (Cover art)
 Gallery of Suicide (1998) (Cover art)
 Bloodthirst (1999) (Cover art)
 Live Cannibalism (2000) (Live album) (Artwork)
 Live Cannibalism (2000) (Live DVD) (Artwork)
 Gore Obsessed (2002) (Cover art)
 Classic Cannibal Corpse (2002) (Box set) (Cover art)
 Worm Infested (EP) (2003) (Cover art)
 The Wretched Spawn (2004) (Cover art)
 Kill (2006) (Artwork)
 Centuries of Torment: The First 20 Years (2008) (DVD) (Artwork) (Cover art)
 Evisceration Plague (2009) (Cover art)
 Global Evisceration (2011) (Live DVD) (Artwork)
 Torture (2012) (Cover art, as "Vince Locke")
 Dead Human Collection: 25 Years of Death Metal (2013) (Box set) (Cover art) (Logo) (Artwork)
 A Skeletal Domain (2014) (Cover art)
 Red Before Black (2017) (Cover art)
 Violence Unimagined (2021) (Cover art)

Notes

References

Vince Locke at the Big Comic Book DataBase
 Vince Locke at Lambiek's Comiclopedia
 Vince Locke at Barney 
 
  Violence Unimagined Artwork

External links
 

American comic strip cartoonists
American comics artists
Artists from Michigan
Cannibal Corpse
Living people
Role-playing game artists
Year of birth missing (living people)